The Duet technical routine competition at the 2017 World Championships was held on 14 and 16 July 2017.

Results
The preliminary round was started on 14 July at 16:00. The final was held on 16 July at 11:00.

Green denotes finalists

References

Duet technical routine